The 1983 European Marathon Cup was the 2nd edition of the European Marathon Cup of athletics and were held in Laredo, Spain.

Team

Individual men

Individual women

References

Results
1983 European Cup. Association of Road Racing Statisticians. Retrieved 2018-04-15.

External links
 EAA web site

European Marathon Cup
European
International athletics competitions hosted by Spain
European Marathon Cup